{{DISPLAYTITLE:C15H17Cl2NO2}}
The molecular formula C15H17Cl2NO2 (molar mass: 314.207 g/mol) may refer to:

 Bemesetron (MDL-72222)
 Dichloropane

Molecular formulas